The MOLDAU to MULDE series of early, German steam engines were designed as tender locomotives for the Leipzig–Dresden Railway Company (Leipzig-Dresdner Eisenbahn-Compagnie or LDE) for mixed duties.

History
As early as 1866 and 1868 the Leipzig-Dresden Railway had procured  steam engines from Maschinenfabrik Esslingen. The nine locomotives acquired in 1874/75 differed from the older batch mainly in their modern Crampton boilers and inside Allan valve gear.

In the LDE the locomotives were only given names; no running numbers or classification. On being taken over in 1876 by the Royal Saxon State Railways most of them were given new names in order to avoid duplication. In addition they were allocated the running numbers 604 to 612 and grouped into Class K III.

In 1885 their classification was changed to K II and in 1892 they were renumbered from 696 to 704. From 1896 the classification just became II. From 1900 their running numbers were raised by 2000 and the name plates were removed.

In 1904 the first locomotives were retired. Several ended up in 1920 in the fleet of the newly founded Deutsche Reichsbahn. In the preliminary renumbering plan two locomotives were allocated new running numbers: 98 7301 and 7302, the rest were not covered.

In 1923 the last locomotive in this class, the former MOLDAU, was withdrawn from the fleet.

Locomotive table

See also
 Royal Saxon State Railways
 List of Saxon locomotives and railbuses
 Leipzig–Dresden Railway Company

References

 
 

2-4-0 locomotives
Locomotives of Saxony
Esslingen locomotives
Railway locomotives introduced in 1874